Russian legal historians, scholars who study Russian law in historical perspective, include:
 Harold J. Berman (1918–2007), Harvard law professor and expert on Russian law
 William E. Butler (1939–), distinguished professor of law at Dickinson School of Law, Penn State University
 Boris Chicherin (1828–1904), Russian jurist and political philosopher
  (1933–), professor of international law at Leiden University, former Dean of Law Faculty of Leiden University and leading sovietologist. Editor of Encyclopedia of Soviet Law and author of Medieval History of Russia (Nijhoff, 2009)
 V.E. Grabar, author of influential History of International Law in Russia (1847–1917)
 Aleksandr Gradovsky (1841–1889), Russian jurist
 John N. Hazard (1909–1995), leading American sovietologist and expert on Russian law
 Dmitri Kachenovsky (1827–1872), influential liberal jurist in Russia
 Leonid Alekseevich Kamarovsky (1846–1912), professor of international law at Moscow State University
 Konstantin Kavelin (1818–1885), Russian historian, jurist, and sociologist
 Nikolay Korkunov (1855–1904), professor for constitutional and international law at the University of Saint Petersburg
 Evgeny A. Korovin (1892–1964), professor of international law, Moscow State University
 Maksim Kovalevsky (1851–1916), professor of legal history at St. Petersburg University
 Friedrich Martens (1845–1909), considered the Russian "father" of modern international law
 V.A. Nezabitovsky (1824–1883), jurist at Kiev University
 Evgeny Pashukanis (1891–1937), head of Soviet Institute of State and Law, executed by Stalin in the Great Purge
  (1868–1920), Russian lawyer, professor, and doctor of Roman law
 William E. Pomeranz (1960–), adjunct professor at Georgetown University and Director of the Kennan Institute at the Woodrow Wilson International Center for Scholars
 John Quigley (academic) (1940–), professor of law at the Moritz College of Law at the Ohio State University
 Dmitry Samokvasov (1843–1911), Russian archaeologist and legal historian
 Peter Berngardovich Struve (1870–1944), father of legal Marxism
 Mikhail Taube (1869–1961), scholar of international law
 Grigory Tunkin (1906–1993), professor of international law at Moscow State University

See also
 Law of the Russian Federation
 List of scholars in Russian law
 List of Russian historians

Legal history of Russia
 
 
Soviet jurists